Aparajita was an eighth century Digambara monk.

Biography
Aparajita was an eighth century Digambara monk who defended the practice of Digambara monks of being nude. His explanation reduced Śvētāmbara monks and nuns to the status of lay people. He explained that Digambara does not mean just being nude, instead it means "abandonment of all possessions", the desire to possess things, and the fear of losing them.

Notes

References
 

Indian Jain monks 
8th-century Indian Jains 
8th-century Jain monks 
8th-century Indian monks